This article has lists of U.S. states by adult incarceration and correctional supervision rates according to United States Department of Justice figures. The state incarceration numbers include sentenced and un-sentenced inmates in jails and state prisons, but not persons in federal prisons. They are listed separately. The state numbers also do not include youth held in juvenile detention. There is a separate table of incarceration numbers for U.S. territories.



Incarceration rate by state

U.S. states by incarceration rate under state prison or local jail jurisdiction per 100,000 population. Rates are for year-end 2018. The table below has all 50 states and the District of Columbia.

Note: The table is initially in descending order for rate per 100,000 of all ages.
Note: The columns can be sorted  in ascending or descending order. Sort state name column to return to alphabetical order.
Note: There are 2 state incarceration rate columns: One per 100,000 of all ages. And one per 100,000 adults.
Note: Federal prison inmates are not included in state rates.
Row numbers: The row number column on the left does not sort, and remains static.

* indicates "Incarceration in STATE" or "Crime in STATE" links.

Incarceration stats by US territory, and percent female 

* indicates "Incarceration in STATE" or "Crime in STATE" links.

Juvenile detention 

Juvenile detention totals from the Office of Juvenile Justice and Delinquency Prevention.

Comparison with other countries

According to the World Prison Brief the United States currently has the largest prison population in the world, and the highest incarceration rate.

On January 1, 2008 more than 1 in 100 adults in the United States were in prison or jail. Total US incarceration peaked in 2008.

In addition to the overall highest incarceration rate, the United States also has the highest rate of female incarceration. According to a November 2017 report by the World Prison Brief around 212,000 of the 714,000 female prisoners worldwide (women and girls) are incarcerated in the United States. In the United States in 2016, women made up 9.8% of the incarcerated population in adult prisons and jails. 

Comparing English-speaking developed countries; the overall incarceration rate in the US is 639 per 100,000 population of all ages (as of 2018), the incarceration rate of Canada is 104 per 100,000 (as of 2018), England and Wales is 130 per 100,000 (as of 2021), and Australia is 160 per 100,000 (as of 2020). Comparing other developed countries, the rate of Spain is 122 per 100,000 (as of 2020), France is 90 per 100,000 (as of 2020), Germany is 69 per 100,000 (as of 2020), Norway is 49 per 100,000 (as of 2020), Netherlands is 63 per 100,000 (as of 2018), and Japan is 38 per 100,000 (as of 2019).

In addition, the United States has striking statistics when observing the racial dimension of mass incarceration. According to Michelle Alexander (in 2010 book), the United States "imprisons a larger percentage of its black population than South Africa did at the height of apartheid."

Correctional supervision rates by state 

Chart below has numbers for people in adult facilities, and for people on probation and on parole. The incarceration numbers for the states in the chart below are for sentenced and unsentenced inmates in adult facilities in local jails and state prisons. Numbers for federal prisons are in one of the header lines at the top.

* indicates "Incarceration in STATE" or "Crime in STATE" links.

Male and female incarceration and correctional supervision numbers 

In 2015 there were 1,942,500 male and 202,600 female inmates in prisons and jails. That is 10.4% female. See the state, federal, and overall total at the bottom of the table. 

* indicates "Incarceration in STATE" or "Crime in STATE" links.

State female incarceration rates compared to countries 

Female incarceration rates by country and US state. Per 100,000 female population of all ages. Female incarceration rates if every US state were a country. Incarcerated females of all ages (where the data is available). From a 2018 report with latest available data. From the source report: "Figure 1. This graph shows the number of women in state prisons, local jails, and federal prisons from each U.S. state per 100,000 people in that state and the incarceration rate per 100,000 in all countries with at least a half million in total population."

See also 
 United States incarceration rate
 Incarceration in the United States
 Incarceration of women in the United States
 Racial and ethnic demographics of the United States
 Race and the War on Drugs
 Youth incarceration in the United States
 School-to-prison pipeline
 List of U.S. states by homicide rate

References

External links

 Rate Per 100,000 and Rank by State of Crime and Imprisonment by US States 1978 - 2012
 Crime, Punishment and Ratio of Crime to Punishment Per 100,000 and Rank by Year and between States

Incarceration rates in the United States
Penal system in the United States
Human rights in the United States
Incarceration Rate
Race and crime in the United States
Incarceration Rate